Callochromis melanostigma is a species of cichlid endemic to Lake Tanganyika where it prefers sandy bottoms with nearby rocks.  This fish grows to a length of  TL.  It is also found in the aquarium trade.

References

melanostigma
Taxa named by George Albert Boulenger
Taxonomy articles created by Polbot
Fish described in 1906